Patrick Timothy Moore (born September 17, 1953) is an American former diver. He was born in Columbus, Ohio. Moore competed in the 1976 Summer Olympics, where he placed 5th in the men's 10 metre platform. At the 1975 Pan American Games he won a gold medal in 3m springboard and a silver medal in 10m platform.

References

1953 births
Living people
Olympic divers of the United States
Divers at the 1976 Summer Olympics
Sportspeople from Columbus, Ohio
American male divers
Pan American Games gold medalists for the United States
Pan American Games silver medalists for the United States
Pan American Games medalists in diving
Divers at the 1975 Pan American Games
Medalists at the 1975 Pan American Games